Gonocephalus kuhlii is a species of agamid lizard. It is found in Indonesia.

References

Gonocephalus
Reptiles of Indonesia
Reptiles described in 1851
Taxa named by Hermann Schlegel
Fauna of Java
Fauna of Sumatra